The 1911–12 Seton Hall Pirates men's basketball team represented Seton Hall University during the 1911–12 college men's basketball season. The head coach was Frank Hill, coaching his first season with the Pirates.

Schedule

|-

References

Seton Hall Pirates men's basketball seasons
Seton Hall
Seton Hall
Seton Hall